was a town located in Ōita District, Ōita Prefecture, Japan.

As of 2003, the town had an estimated population of 5,055 and the density of 55.71 persons per km2. The total area was 90.74 km2.

On January 1, 2005, Notsuharu, along with the town of Saganoseki (from Kitaamabe District), was merged with the expanded city of Ōita.

Dissolved municipalities of Ōita Prefecture